Badlands is the musical solo name used by Swedish producer, composer and sound designer Catharina Jaunviksna based in Malmö. With a wide inspirational range from post punk to warehouse techno-like ambiences, she makes lush and alluring tracks rooted in vintage synths and drum machines, gritty pedal work, club beats and organic orchestration.

Jaunviksna started to explore analog midi and sampling as a teenager, finding a musical sanctuary in her own electronic compositions. Merging from music to sound design, she attended the sound design program at the reputable National Film School of Denmark 2009–2011, but became the educations first dropout due to her constant longing to make music. She then formed Badlands as a home for her new electroacoustic fusions with vocals and released first Badlands EP Battles Within (2012), followed by album Locus (2016). Acclaimed album Djinn was released in 2021 as a memorial to her late mother. November 18, 2022 Badlands released her third studio album Call to Love.

The DIY approach is crucial to the distinct Badlands sound, where Jaunviksna exclusively writes, records, produces and mixes all material. She is the founder of the electronic record label, arts platform and production company RITE in Malmö, Sweden, from where she also makes original music and sound designs for film and theater, transboundary arts and documentary, as well as production, remixes and mix work for other labels and artists.

Discography

Albums 
Call to Love (2022)
Djinn (2021)
Locus (2016)

Singles 
I Want Blood (2022) 
Bury You Whole (2022) 
My Time Will Come Again (2022)
Out of Reach (2021)
Southbound Call (2021)
Hearts featuring J. Cowhie (remastered album version, 2020)
Hearts (2019)
Echo (2016)
Caramisou (2016)
Tutu (2013)
Never Dry Out (2012)

EP 
 Fantasma I / Fantasma II (double single/EP, 2020)
 Battles Within (released as a duo together with Niklas Tjäder, EP, 2012)

References

External links 
 Official website
RITE Label homepage

Swedish pop musicians
People from Malmö Municipality
Musicians from Skåne County